Kantipur (Nepali: कान्तिपुर) is a Nepali language daily newspaper, published from Kathmandu, Biratnagar, Nepalgunj, and Bharatpur of Nepal simultaneously. It was founded by Shyam Goenka. Kantipur'''s publishers report that the circulation of this newspaper is just above 453,000 copies per day. It is regarded as the most widely read newspaper in Nepal; according to an audience survey in 2016, over half of those who read newspapers in Nepal were readers of Kantipur, considerably more than any other newspapers. The newspaper is also a source of information of homeland for Nepali diaspora. 

Sudheer Sharma has been the editor-in-chief of the newspaper since August 6, 2019  (Second time joined after nearly one and half year). The other sister publications of Kantipur Daily are Nari Magazine (Monthly Magazine), Nepal Magazine (Weekly Magazine), and Saptahik (Weekly Magazine).

 History Kantipur which was first published on 7th Falgun 2049 BS (18 February 1993) along with its sister publication The Kathmandu Post, is often credited for taking the lead in institutionalizing free press and professional journalism in the country. Kantipur has not only been praised for its stance towards multi-party democracy and press freedom in Nepal but also has faced government scrutiny and repression.

 Controversies 
After publishing the rebel leader Baburam Bhattarai's article on the Royal Massacre in 2001, the government arrested Kantipur's editor Yuvraj Ghimire along with other members in the management team. 
In June 2010, Kantipur accused the Indian Embassy of interfering with its coverage by punitively withdrawing advertisements from the company and delaying shipments of newsprint from India.

In March 2018, the Kantipur daily was subpoenaed by the Chief Justice of Nepal Gopal Prasad Parajuli. The Kantipur's Editor-in-chief, Chairman, a Company Director and a reporter appeared before the Supreme Court of Nepal, as the Kantipur daily was accused of contempt of court for a series of articles indicating that the Chief Justice of Nepal Gopal Prasad Parajuli had given different dates of birth on several official documents.

 Supplements Kantipur used to publish three supplements, on Fridays, Saturdays and Sundays called Shukrabar, Kosheli and Kopila. Shukrabar was targeted mainly towards youth with articles on gadgets, fashion, and trends. Kosheli was a variety, while Kopila'' was targeted towards kids with puzzles, arts, and stories.

See also
Nagarik
Gorkhapatra
Kathmandu Post
Annapurna Post
Techpana]

References

Social media
Kantipur Daily Instagram
 Kantipur Daily Twitter
Kantipur Daily Facebook
Kantipur Daily Tiktok

Nepali-language newspapers
Daily newspapers published in Nepal
1993 establishments in Nepal